The Grande Oriente do Brasil is a masonic body in Brazil. It was founded in 1822. It has 1700 lodges with around 100,000 members. It is within the tradition of Anglo-American Freemasonry.

Grand Masters
 1° (1822-1822): José Bonifácio de Andrada e Silva
 2° (1822-1822): Emperor Pedro I
 3° (1831-1837): José Bonifácio de Andrada e Silva
 4° (1837-1850): Antônio Francisco de Paula de Holanda Cavalcanti de Albuquerque
 5° (1850-1863): Miguel Calmon du Pin e Almeida
 6° (1850-1863): Luís Alves de Lima e Silva (Honorary)
 7° (1863-1864): Bento da Silva Lisboa
 8° (1864-1871): Joaquim Marcelino de Brito
 9° (1871-1880): José Maria da Silva Paranhos
 10° (1880-1885): Francisco José Cardoso Júnior
 11°(1885-1889): Luís Antônio Vieira da Silva
 12° (1889-1890): João Batista Gonçalves Campos
 13° (1890-1892): Manuel Deodoro da Fonseca
 14° (1892-1901): Antônio Joaquim de Macedo Soares
 15° (1901-1904): Quintino Antônio Ferreira de Sousa Bocaiuva
 16° (1904-1916): Lauro Nina Sodré e Silva
 17° (1905-1905): Francisco Glicério de Cerqueira Leite (Interim)
 18° (1917-1919): Nilo Procópio Peçanha
 19° (1922-1925): Mario Marinho de Carvalho Behring
 20° (1925-1926): Vicente Saraiva de Carvalho Neiva
 21° (1926-1927): João Severiano da Fonseca Hermes
 22° (1927-1933): Octávio Kelly
 23° (1933-1940): José Maria Moreira Guimarães
 24° (1940-1952): Joaquim Rodrigues Neves
 25° (1953-1954): Benjamin de Almeida Sodré
 26° (1954-1963): Cyro Werneck de Sousa e Silva
 XX  (1964-1968): Álvaro Palmeira
 27° (1968-1973): Moacyr Arbex Dinamarco
 28° (1973-1978): Osmane Vieira de Resende
 29° (1978-1983): Osires Teixeira
 30° (1983-1987): Jair Assis Ribeiro
 31° (1987-1988): Enoc Almeida Vieira
 32° (1988-1993): Jair Assis Ribeiro
 33° (1993-2001): Francisco Murilo Pinto
 34° (2001-2008): Laelson Rodrigues
 35° (2008-2018): Marcos José da Silva
 36° (2018-2019): Ricardo Maciel Monteiro de Carvalho (Interim)
 37° (2019-present): Múcio Bonifácio Guimarães

References

Grand Lodges
Freemasonry in Brazil
1822 establishments in Brazil
Organisations based in Brasília